Canal Crossing is a New Urbanism project on the eastern side of Jersey City, New Jersey between Jackson Hill in Greenville/Bergen-Lafayette  and Liberty State Park. The approximately 111 acre area, previously designated for industrial and distribution uses has been re-zoned for transit-oriented residential and commercial use and the construction of a neighborhood characterized as a sustainable community. The name is inspired by the Morris Canal, which once traversed the district in a general north and south alignment. The brownfield site must first undergo remediation of toxic waste, much of it left by PPG Industries The redevelopment plans call for 7,000 housing units, mainly "mid-rise" buildings (with heights limited to five stories), and a greenway along the former canal, directly south of the 17-acre Berry Lane Park.

Two branches of the Hudson-Bergen Light Rail (HBLR) system create the northern and eastern borders of Canal Crossing. A new station at Caven Point Avenue is proposed on the line between Bayonne and Hoboken Terminal along its eastern perimeter between current stations  at Richard Street and Liberty State Park. The triangular shape area is bounded by Garfield Avenue on the west, and is accessible from the Newark Bay Extension of the New Jersey Turnpike at its southern tip.

In October 2010, the city received notification of a $2.3 million TIGER grant for continued work on the project.
The funding was jeopardized by potential cuts being made in the House of Representatives, but was later allocated. A synopsis of the grant stated:

PPG sued the United States for cleanup costs, arguing that the government's wartime control over the plant during both world wars exposed it to partial liability for the cleanup. The district court held in 2018 that the government's general wartime control of the plant was insufficient to create liability in the absence of a direct connection between the government and waste disposal activities. 

PPG has sued the Jersey City Redevelopment Authority stating that its redevelopment plans are hindered by that of the agency.

In September 2019 it was announced that the Critierian Group would convert a warehouse in the district to the state's largest film studio.

See also
Bayfront, Jersey City
PJP Landfill
List of Superfund sites in New Jersey

References

External links
The Jersey City Chromium Lawsuit
Hampshire Company development
Fulop PPG Battle over future development Feb 2015

Neighborhoods in Jersey City, New Jersey
Geography of Hudson County, New Jersey
New Urbanism communities